On 15 March and 12 December 2020, jihadist group Boko Haram carried out attacks in Toumour, Diffa Region, Niger.

On 15 March 2020, Boko Haram attacked a military post, injuring a soldier. They were repelled, during which 50 insurgents were killed.

On 12 December 2020, Boko Haram attacked the village, killing 28 people: 10 from gunshots, 14 by fire and four by drowning. The insurgents injured about 100 other people and burned 800 homes.

References

2020 murders in Niger
Boko Haram attacks
December 2020 crimes in Africa
Diffa Region
March 2020 crimes in Africa
March 2020 events in Africa